The Play of Daniel, or Ludus Danielis, is either of two medieval Latin liturgical dramas based on the biblical Book of Daniel, one of which is accompanied by monophonic music.

The play itself dates from c. 1140. Two medieval plays of Daniel survive. The first version is in a manuscript conserved in the French National Library (Lat 11331) ; the text is by Hilarius, and no music accompanies it. The second version is a 13th-century drama with monophonic music, written about 1227 to 1234 by students at the school of Beauvais Cathedral, located in northern France. A large portion of the text is poetic rather than strictly liturgical in origin; it closely follows the narrative of the biblical story of Daniel at the court of Belshazzar.

In the US the latter play was revived in the 1950s by Noah Greenberg, director of the New York Pro Musica; a commentary in English, written and performed by W. H. Auden, was used in some of their performances. A recorded 1958 performance by the group at the Metropolitan Museum of Art, and featuring boy choristers of the Church of the Transfiguration as satraps and soldiers, was released by Decca, with sleeve notes by Paul Henry Lang and Dom Rembert Weakland, O.S.B., who had discovered the text at the British Library. Since the New York Pro Musica production it has enjoyed many performances among early music troupes. Also important in the history of modern revivals of the Beauvais Cathedral version, Daniel  was the 1985 production of the Boston Camerata, staged by Andrea von Ramm, with musical direction by Joel Cohen. In 2008, The Dufay Collective and William Lyons released their CD, The Play of Daniel on the Harmonia Mundi usa label. A new production of the Play of Daniel by the Boston Camerata, this time under the direction of French-born medievalist Anne Azéma, was presented in Boston in November, 2014. Daniel was played by tenor Jordan Weatherston Pitts.

In 2008, a new production, staged by Drew Minter with musical direction by Mary Anne Ballard in commemoration of the 50th anniversary of the noted Cloisters production of 1958, was created, also at the Cloisters.  The show has been reprised in subsequent seasons, in 2012 at the Cloisters and in 2013 and 2014 as part of the Twelfth Night Festival at Trinity Church Wall Street.

Characters
 Belshazzar's Prince
 Belshazzar
 Two Wise Men
 Three Envious Counselors
 Habakkuk
 Belshazzar's Queen
 Daniel
 Darius the Mede
 Two Advisors
 An angel
 Herald Angel
 Satraps and soldiers

Adaptations
It was adapted for Australian TV in 1961.

References

Recordings
 The Dufay Collective: The Play of Daniel. harmonia mundi usa, 2008
 New York's Ensemble for Early Music: "Ludus Danielis". Dir. Renz Frederick - Foné Ita, 1996
 Ensemble Venance Fortunat: "Daniel - Opéra sacré". Dir. Anne-Marie Deschamps - L'Empreinte Digitale, 1996

Further reading
 Richard H. Hoppin, Medieval Music. New York, W.W. Norton & Co., 1978.
 Stevens, John. "Medieval Drama, II", in Grove Music Online (Accessed October 11, 2006), (subscription access) 

Medieval drama
Plays based on the Bible
Cultural depictions of Belshazzar
Darius the Mede
United States National Recording Registry recordings
Medieval compositions
Plays set in the 6th century BC
Cultural depictions of Daniel (biblical figure)